Nicole Marie Lenz (born January 24, 1980) is an American model, film and television actress, and health advocate.

Family and  personal life
Nicole was born in 1980, in Cleveland, Ohio, to Laura Lenz, a secretary and Theodore Lenz, a contractor. She was raised in North Royalton and has a younger sister named Emilie. She's of mixed Swiss, German, English, and Italian ancestry. Lenz was raised in a small town in North Eastern Ohio. Lenz's great grandfather was responsible for the architecture of the Terminal Tower, a landmark skyscraper located on Public Square in downtown Cleveland, Ohio.

Lenz has one daughter named Leia Elizabeth who was born in 2009.

Lenz previously shared a Los Angeles home with hotel heiress Paris Hilton.

Career

Lenz grew up in northeast Ohio and started modeling for Ford Models in her teens. She gained major public recognition in 2000, appearing in the Millennium issue of Playboy as Miss March 2000, after winning 3rd place in a worldwide contest where over 15,000 women were entered. She was also featured in the November issue of W photographed by Mario Sorrenti.  She subsequently signed a modeling contract with Elite modeling agency, before appearing on the cover of men's magazines including French Playboy and Italian Max magazine. She was also ranked number 94 of the "100 Sexiest Women" in the US by Stuff and Maxim, in 2007.

Lenz made her film debut in August 2003 in Confidence, starring Dustin Hoffman and Edward Burns and has since appeared in several independent and feature films, including My Sister's Keeper starring Cameron Diaz,  Seeing Other People, Toxic, and Fanboys produced by the Weinstein Company. She also appeared in an episode of CSI: NY, "Playing with Matches" in 2008.

Lenz has been featured in large campaigns doing modeling and commercial television work for Garnier, Joe's Jeans, Pantene, Matrix, Paul Mitchell, Airwalk, Roxy, Adidas, and Sephora to name a few. Lenz has been featured on the covers of Health, Italian Max, and Playboy worldwide, most notably American and French Playboy. Lenz also appeared  in high fashion editorials for magazines such as Vogue (Italy and Russia).

Lenz has also appeared in several music videos, including for Elton John, Paul McCartney, Robbie Williams, and Duran Duran.

Later life and philanthropy
After her daughter’s birth, Lenz gave up acting and modeling and began working professionally as a Health advocate. Lenz started her own company in healthcare, in 2014. It was one of the first companies to offer yoga covered by health insurance. Currently, she lives in Los Angeles, California.

Filmography
My Sister's Keeper
Fanboys
Kush

Toxic
That Guy
TV: The Movie
Confidence
Rent Control

References

External links

2000s Playboy Playmates
Actresses from Cleveland
1980 births
Living people
21st-century American women